George Ryan (August 12, 1806 – February 5, 1876) was a New Brunswick farmer and political figure. He represented King's in the 1st Canadian Parliament as a Liberal member.

He was born in Pointe de Bute, New Brunswick in 1806, the son of James Ryan, and moved to Studholm in Kings County with his family in 1814. In 1827, he married Miriam, the daughter of Samuel Freeze, a former member of the provincial assembly. Ryan represented Kings in the Legislative Assembly of New Brunswick from 1850 to 1856, from 1861 to 1865 and in 1866; he was elected to the same seat in the House of Commons following Confederation.

References 

1806 births
1876 deaths
Liberal Party of Canada MPs
Members of the House of Commons of Canada from New Brunswick
New Brunswick Liberal Association MLAs
People from Westmorland County, New Brunswick
Colony of New Brunswick people